Taiwanese may refer to:
 Taiwanese language, another name for Taiwanese Hokkien
 Something from or related to Taiwan (Formosa)
 Taiwanese aborigines, the indigenous people of Taiwan
 Han Taiwanese, the Han people of Taiwan
 Taiwanese people, residents of Taiwan or people of Taiwanese descent
 Taiwanese language (disambiguation)
 Taiwanese culture
 Taiwanese cuisine
 Taiwanese identity

See also
 

Language and nationality disambiguation pages